Maha H. Hussain is the Genevieve E. Teuton Professor of Medicine and deputy director of the Lurie Comprehensive Cancer Center at Northwestern University's Feinberg School of Medicine. She is an oncologist focusing on genitourinary cancers.

Biography
Hussain was born and raised in Baghdad, Iraq. Both of her parents were chemists.

Hussain studied medicine at the College of Medicine University of Baghdad, graduating in 1980. She did her residency in internal medicine from 1980 to 1983 and fellowship in hematology/oncology from 1983 to 1986 at Wayne State University School of Medicine in Detroit, Michigan. After finishing her training, she worked as a hematologist/oncologist at the VA Medical Center in Detroit for ten years.

She joined the faculty at the University of Michigan in 2002. There, she was the Cis Maisel Professor of Oncology and assistant director of clinical research.
In 2016, she joined the faculty at Northwestern University, where she is the Genevieve E. Teuton Professor of Medicine and deputy director of the Robert H. Lurie Comprehensive Cancer Center at the Feinberg School of Medicine.

In 2010, she was elected as a fellow of the American Society for Clinical Oncology (ASCO). She has served on ASCO's board of directors and Clinical Practice Guidelines Committee. In 2015, she was named one of the Giants of Cancer Care by OncLive.

References 

American oncologists
Northwestern University faculty
Wayne State University alumni
University of Baghdad alumni
University of Michigan faculty
Year of birth missing (living people)
Living people
Iraqi emigrants to the United States
Physicians from Baghdad